Afro-Cuban Jazz Moods is an album by Dizzy Gillespie and Machito, featuring arrangements by Chico O'Farrill, recorded in 1975 and released on the Pablo label.

Reception
The Allmusic review called the album "a historic recording session".

Track listing
All compositions by Chico O'Farrill.

 "Oro, Incienso y Mirra" - 15:38 
 "Galidoscopico" - 5:05 
 "Pensativo" - 5:20 
 "Exuberante" - 5:48

Personnel
Dizzy Gillespie - trumpet
Machito - marimba, clavinet, leader
Manny Duran, Paul Gonzalez, Raul Gonzalez Jr., Victor Paz - trumpet, flugelhorn
Jerry Chamberlain, Jack Jeffers, Lewis Kahn, Barry Morrow - trombone
Don Corrado, Brooks Tillotson - French horn
Bob Stewart - tuba
Mauricio Smith - alto saxophone, flute, piccolo
Mario Bauzá - alto saxophone, clarinet
Mario Rivera - tenor saxophone, alto flute
Jose Madera Sr. - tenor saxophone, clarinet
Leslie Yahonikan - baritone saxophone, bass clarinet
Jorge Dalto - electric piano
Dana McCurdy - synthesizer
Carlos Castillo - electric bass
Mickey Roker - drums 
Julito Grillo, Raymond Hernandez - African drums
Pepin Pepin - congas
Mario Grillo - bongos, cowbell
Jose Madera Jr. - timpani
Chico O'Farrill - arranger, conductor

References 

Pablo Records albums
Dizzy Gillespie albums
Albums arranged by Chico O'Farrill
Albums conducted by Chico O'Farrill
Albums produced by Norman Granz
1975 albums
Afro-Cuban jazz albums